Ilybius oblitus is a species of predaceous diving beetle in the family Dytiscidae. It is found in North America.This species can tolerate low temperatures, but is still susceptible to freezing.

References

Further reading

 
 
 

oblitus
Articles created by Qbugbot
Beetles described in 1882